The 1988 South Australian Soccer Federation season was the 82nd season of soccer in South Australia.

1988 SASF Division One

The 1988 South Australian Division One season was the top level domestic association football competition in South Australia for 1988. It was contested by 12 teams in a 22-round league format, each team playing all of their opponents twice.

League table

1988 Coca Cola Challenge Cup
The 1988 Coca Cola Challenge Cup was a knockout competition, contested by the top four teams from the Division One season.

Bracket

1988 SASF Division Two

The 1988 South Australian Division Two season was the second level domestic association football competition in South Australia for 1988. It was contested by 10 teams in a 18-round league format, each team playing all of their opponents twice.

League table

References

1988 in Australian soccer
Football South Australia seasons